William Mackay Malarkey (18 June 1951– 20 February 2020) was a Manx politician, who was elected Liberal Vannin MHK for Douglas South but later defected from the party and sat as an independent. In the 2011 general election he lost his seat to Liberal Vannin candidate Kate Beecroft. He was re-elected at a by-election in May 2015 as an independent candidate, and retained his seat for Douglas South in September 2016.

Bill Malarkey died on 20 February 2020. He had been suffering from cancer for some time.

Career

At the 2006 Manx general election, Malarkey was elected as the Liberal Vannin Party Member of the House of Keys for Douglas South, alongside David Cretney who was elected for the Manx Labour Party. Malarkey was one of only two Liberal Vannin MHKs elected in 2006, the other being Peter Karran, the party Leader.

At the 2011 Manx general election, Malarkey contested Douglas South as an Independent, opposing both Cretney and the official Liberal Vannin Party candidate, Kate Beecroft. Malarkey was narrowly defeated and was not elected.

Following Cretney's election to the Legislative Council in mid-2015, Malarkey contested the ensuing by-election in Douglas South, winning as an Independent.

Malarkey was re-elected for Douglas South in the 2016 General Election and was appointed Minister for Home Affairs.

References

1951 births
2020 deaths
21st-century Manx politicians
Liberal Vannin Party politicians
Members of the House of Keys 2006–2011
Members of the House of Keys 2011–2016
Members of the House of Keys 2016–2021